
This is a list of parties to international patent treaties which are open to all states.

ParisParis Convention for the Protection of Industrial Property, Paris, 1883-03-20, came into force 1884-07-07
PCTPatent Cooperation Treaty, Washington, 1970-06-19, came into force 1978-01-24
BudapestBudapest Treaty on the International Recognition of the Deposit of Microorganisms for the Purposes of Patent Procedure, Budapest, 1977-04-28, came into force 1980-08-19
TRIPSAgreement on Trade-Related Aspects of Intellectual Property Rights, Marrakech, 1994-04-15, came into force 1995-01-01
PLTPatent Law Treaty, Geneva, 2000-06-01, came into force 2005-04-28

The list below was taken from details supplied by WIPO and the WTO. Dates quoted are the date on which the treaty came into effect for a given country.

Notes

See also 
African Regional Intellectual Property Organization (ARIPO)
Eurasian Patent Organization (EAPO)
European Patent Organisation (EPO)
World Intellectual Property Organization (WIPO)
World Trade Organization (WTO)
List of parties to international copyright treaties
List of parties to international related rights treaties

References

External links 
Paris Convention for the Protection of Industrial Property
Patent Cooperation Treaty
Budapest Treaty on the International Recognition of the Deposit of Microorganisms for the Purposes of Patent Procedure
Agreement on Trade-Related Aspects of Intellectual Property Rights
Patent Law Treaty

Patent law lists
Parties
Patents